Georgia Abatzidou (born 19 April 1969) is a Greek long-distance runner. She competed in the women's marathon at the 2004 Summer Olympics.

References

External links

1969 births
Living people
Athletes (track and field) at the 2004 Summer Olympics
Greek female long-distance runners
Greek female marathon runners
Olympic athletes of Greece
People from Servia
Sportspeople from Western Macedonia